County Fair may refer to:

Film
 The County Fair (1912 film), an American short silent drama film
 The County Fair (1920 film), a silent American film
 Kounty Fair, a 1930 animated short featuring Oswald the Lucky Rabbit
 The County Fair (1934 film), an animated short featuring Oswald the Lucky Rabbit
 The County Fair (1932 film), an American film directed by Louis King 
 County Fair (1937 film), an American film by Howard Bretherton 
 County Fair (1950 film), an American film by  William Beaudine

Other uses
 County fair or agricultural show
 "County Fair" (Beach Boys song)
 "County Fair" (Moldy Peaches song)
 "The County Fair" (The Naked Brothers Band), an episode of The Naked Brothers Band

See also
 Country Fair (disambiguation)